Milyonêr (English translation: Millionaire) is an Iraqi Kurdish-language game show based on the original British format of Who Wants to Be a Millionaire? The show is hosted by Shuan Haco. The main goal of the game is to win 100 million Iraqi dinars by answering 15 multiple-choice questions correctly. There are three lifelines - fifty fifty, phone a friend and ask the audience.

Milyonêr was broadcast from 2009 to 2011. It is shown on the Kurdistani TV station Kanal4. When a contestant gets the third question correct, he will leave with at least ID 25,000. When a contestant gets the sixth question correct, he will leave with at least ID 250,000. When a contestant gets the ninth question correct, he will leave with at least ID 3,000,000. When a contestant gets the twelfth question correct, he will with at least ID 15,000,000.

Later the guaranteed sum was changed, now they was appeared on question 5 and 10.

The game's prizes

References

Who Wants to Be a Millionaire?
Iraqi television shows
2009 television series debuts
2011 television series endings